"I Used to Work in Chicago" is a drinking song.  It was written by songwriter and entertainer Larry Vincent. The earliest printed date for the song is March 1945 in the underground mimeographed songbook Songs of the Century, however versions of the song circulated "on the street" as early as 1938  according to the Digital Tradition Folk Music Database.  Many of the lyrics are considered humorous because of the oblique sexual references. The song is often chanted by various British university sports teams.

After World War II, there were various versions of this song commercially recorded (e.g. by Spike Jones).

A verse from Spike Jones's version:

Recordings
  The Three Bits Of Rhythm on Modern Records 118A from 1946
  Oscar Brand on Bawdy Songs and Backroom Ballads 1951
  Merle Travis on Guitar Rags & A Too Fast Past 1994
  Benny Bell on Shaving Cream 1975, Track Title: Jack of All Trades

Popular culture
A variation of this song is also occasionally performed by Eddie Vedder of Pearl Jam during their live performances with the final lines, "Liquor she wanted / Lick her I did / I don't work there anymore."
The same (Liquor/Lick her) version is also sung by Dusty and Lefty, played by Woody Harrelson and John C. Reilly, in the film A Prairie Home Companion.
One verse sung by Charles Durning in the movie Jerry and Tom.  "A woman came in for a house dress.  I asked her what kind she wore.  'Jumper,' she said.  Jump her I did and I don't work there anymore."

References

 Cray, Ed; The Erotic Muse: American Bawdy Songs (University of Illinois, 1992).
 Reuss, Richard A.; An Annotated Field Collection of Songs From the American College Student Oral Tradition (Bloomington: Indiana Univ. Masters Thesis, 1965).

Drinking songs
Songs about Chicago
Songs written by Larry Vincent
1945 songs